Yanzhuang is a metro station of Zhengzhou Metro Line 1.

Station layout 
The station has 3 floors underground. The B2 floor is for the station concourse and the B3 floor is for the platforms and tracks. The station has one island platform and two tracks for Line 1.

Exits

Surroundings
Yanzhuang Plaza (燕庄广场)
Shenglong Building (升龙大厦)
Hilton Zhengzhou (希尔顿酒店)
Manhattan Commercial Center (曼哈顿商业中心)
The 3rd Affiliated Hospital of HUTCM (河南中医药大学第三附属医院)

References

Stations of Zhengzhou Metro
Line 1, Zhengzhou Metro
Railway stations in China opened in 2013